General elections were held in Western Samoa on 13 April 1954.

Electoral system
The 26-member Legislative Assembly consisted of the Administrator, six civil servants, twelve Samoans appointed by the Fono of Faipule, two Fautua (Samoan chiefs) and five members directly elected by people with European status, most of whom were part-Samoan.

Results

European members

Samoan members
Two candidates for the Atua seat, Tuatagaloa Leutele Te'o and Fonoti Ioane received the same number of votes. It was decided that as the incumbent Te'o should remain the representative for the constituency, whilst Ioane would be made the twelfth, non-constituency member.

Aftermath
In 1956 the Executive Council was reorganised and a Member System introduced. To'omata Lilomaiava Tua was appointed Member for Agriculture, Tuatagaloa Leutele Te'o as Member for Education, Fonoti Ioane as Member for Health, Tualaulelei Mauri as Member for Lands, Peter Plowman as Member for Transport and Communications, and Harry Moors as Member for Works.

References

Elections in Samoa
Western Samoa
General
Western Samoa